Catheys Creek is a stream in the U.S. state of Tennessee, a tributary of the Duck River.

Catheys Creek has the name of the local Cathey family of pioneer settlers.

See also
List of rivers of Tennessee

References

Rivers of Lewis County, Tennessee
Rivers of Maury County, Tennessee
Rivers of Tennessee